Summanen is a Finnish surname. Notable people with the surname include:

Petteri Summanen, Finnish actor
Raimo Summanen, Finnish ice hockey player
 Seth Everman (born Set Erik Adrian Summanen), Swedish YouTube pianist, of some Finnish descent

See also
Lake Summanen or Summasjärvi, impact crater lake in Saarijärvi, Finland

Finnish-language surnames